Teodora Meluță (born 3 August 1999), often known as Teo Meluță, is a Romanian footballer who plays as a defender for Lugano in Nationalliga A and the Romania women's national team.

Career
Meluță has been capped for the Romania national team, appearing for the team during the 2019 FIFA Women's World Cup qualifying cycle. She was 15 at the time of her debut, making her the youngest footballer to ever represent Romania. On 26 January 2021, it was announced that she was transferring to Swiss club Lugano. Unfortunately, after just seven games, Teodora suffered a fracture of the tibia-fibula and needed surgery. In August 2021, she came back to Romania and transferred to the recently formed team, Politehnica Timișoara.

During her time at Olimpia Cluj, the club won five consecutive league titles, two national cup titles and Meluță herself was declared Romanian Footballer of the Year twice.

References

External links
 
 
 

1999 births
Living people
Romanian women's footballers
Romania women's international footballers
Women's association football defenders
FCU Olimpia Cluj players
Swiss Women's Super League players
Romanian expatriate footballers
Expatriate women's footballers in Switzerland
Romanian expatriate sportspeople in Switzerland
FF Lugano 1976 players